Nikolay Yeroshenko (born 9 February 1975) is a Uzbekistani sprinter. He competed in the men's 4 × 100 metres relay at the 2000 Summer Olympics.

References

1975 births
Living people
Athletes (track and field) at the 2000 Summer Olympics
Uzbekistani male sprinters
Olympic athletes of Uzbekistan
Place of birth missing (living people)